This is the results breakdown of the local elections held in Asturias on 26 May 1991. The following tables show detailed results in the autonomous community's most populous municipalities, sorted alphabetically.

Overall

City control
The following table lists party control in the most populous municipalities, including provincial capitals (shown in bold). Gains for a party are displayed with the cell's background shaded in that party's colour.

Municipalities

Avilés
Population: 88,429

Gijón
Population: 264,948

Langreo
Population: 53,246

Mieres
Population: 57,627

Oviedo
Population: 194,637

San Martín del Rey Aurelio
Population: 24,884

Siero
Population: 43,647

See also
1991 Asturian regional election

References

Asturias
1991